The 1972–73 NHL season was the 56th season of the National Hockey League. Sixteen teams each played 78 games. Two new teams, the New York Islanders and the Atlanta Flames, made their debuts. The Montreal Canadiens won the Stanley Cup by beating the Chicago Black Hawks four games to two in the Stanley Cup Final.

Pre-season
Prior to the start of the season, the 1972 Summit Series took place. It was the first ever meeting between Soviet Union and NHL calibre Canadian ice hockey players. Canada expected to easily beat the Soviets, but were shocked to find themselves with a losing record of one win, two losses, and a tie after four games in Canada. In game four, which Canada lost 5–3, Vancouver fans echoed the rest of Canada's thoughts of Team Canada's poor performance by booing them off the ice. The final four games were played in the Soviet Union. Canada lost game five, but won the last three for a final record of four wins, three losses, and a tie.

For the first time since the collapse of the Western Hockey League in 1926, the National Hockey League had serious competition. A new professional hockey league, the World Hockey Association, made its season debut with 12 new teams, half of which were based in cities with existing NHL teams. Unlike the Western Hockey League, though, the new World Hockey Association would not challenge for the Stanley Cup. In response to the new league, the NHL hastily added two new teams in an unplanned expansion, the New York Islanders and Atlanta Flames, in an attempt to exclude the WHA from newly constructed arenas in those markets.

In February 1972, the Miami Screaming Eagles of the WHA signed Bernie Parent to a contract, and when Bobby Hull was signed on June 27, 1972, to play with the Winnipeg Jets, the Chicago Black Hawks sued, claiming a violation of the reserve clause in NHL contracts. Others soon followed Hull to the WHA, including, J. C. Tremblay, Ted Green, Gerry Cheevers and Johnny McKenzie. In the expansion draft, the New York Islanders and Atlanta Flames made their picks and eleven Islander players skipped off to the WHA. The California Golden Seals, chafing under the unorthodox ownership of the unpopular Charlie Finley, were also a victim of the WHA, losing eight key players.

Regular season
The Montreal Canadiens took over first place in the East Division and the league from the Boston Bruins while for the third consecutive season the Chicago Black Hawks dominated the West Division.

Final standings

Playoffs
No teams in the playoffs swept their opponents, the last time this would happen until 1991, and no series went to a seventh game, the last time this has happened to date. In addition, the Chicago Black Hawks reached the Stanley Cup Finals without a captain, the last time this would happen until 2014.

Playoff bracket

Quarterfinals

(E1) Montreal Canadiens vs. (E4) Buffalo Sabres

The Montreal Canadiens finished first in the league with 120 points. The Buffalo Sabres finished fourth with 88 points. This was the first playoff meeting between these two teams. This was the Buffalo Sabres' first playoff appearance in their third season since entering the league in the 1970–71 NHL season. Montreal won the five-game regular season series earning six of ten points.

(E2) Boston Bruins vs. (E3) New York Rangers

The Boston Bruins finished second in the East Division with 107 points. The New York Rangers finished third in the East Division with 102 points. This was the ninth playoff meeting between these two teams with Boston winning six of the eight previous series. They last met in the previous year's Stanley Cup Finals which Boston won in six games. The teams split this year's six-game regular season series.

(W1) Chicago Black Hawks vs. (W4) St. Louis Blues

The Chicago Black Hawks finished first in the West Division with 93 points. The St. Louis Blues finished fourth in the West Division with 76 points. This was the first playoff meeting between these two teams. The teams split this year's six-game regular season series.

(W2) Philadelphia Flyers vs. (W3) Minnesota North Stars

The Philadelphia Flyers and Minnesota North Stars finished tied for second in the West Division each with 85 points (Philadelphia won the tiebreaker in season series 3–2). This was the first playoff meeting between these two teams. Philadelphia won three of the five games in this year's regular season series.

Semifinals

(E1) Montreal Canadiens vs. (W3) Philadelphia Flyers

This was the first playoff meeting between these two teams. The teams split this year's five-game regular season series.

(W1) Chicago Black Hawks vs. (E3) New York Rangers

This was the fifth playoff meeting between these two teams with Chicago winning three of the four previous series. They last met in the previous year's Stanley Cup Semifinals which New York won in a four-game sweep. The teams split this year's five-game regular season series.

Stanley Cup Finals

It was the 16th playoff meeting between these two teams. Montreal lead 10–5 in their previous meetings. This was a rematch of the 1971 Stanley Cup Finals, which Montreal won in seven games. Chicago won three of the five games in this year's regular season series.

Awards

All-Star teams

Player statistics

Scoring leaders

Source: NHL.

Leading goaltenders
Note: GP = Games played; Min = Minutes played; GA = Goals against; GAA = Goals against average; W = Wins; L = Losses; T = Ties; SO = Shutouts

Other statistics
 Plus-minus leader: Jacques Laperriere, Montreal Canadiens

Coaches

East
Boston Bruins: Tom Johnson and Bep Guidolin
Buffalo Sabres: Joe Crozier
Detroit Red Wings: Johnny Wilson
Montreal Canadiens: Scotty Bowman
New York Islanders: Phil Goyette and Earl Ingarfield
New York Rangers: Emile Francis
Toronto Maple Leafs: John McLellan
Vancouver Canucks: Vic Stasiuk

West
Atlanta Flames: Bernie Geoffrion
California Golden Seals: Garry Young and Fred Glover
Chicago Black Hawks: Billy Reay
Los Angeles Kings: Bob Pulford
Minnesota North Stars: Jack Gordon
Philadelphia Flyers: Fred Shero
Pittsburgh Penguins: Red Kelly
St. Louis Blues: Al Arbour and Jean-Guy Talbot

Debuts
The following is a list of players of note who played their first NHL game in 1972–73 (listed with their first team, asterisk(*) marks debut in playoffs):
Dan Bouchard, Atlanta Flames
Jacques Richard, Atlanta Flames
Jim Schoenfeld, Buffalo Sabres
Phil Russell, Chicago Black Hawks
Robbie Ftorek, Detroit Red Wings
Steve Shutt, Montreal Canadiens
Larry Robinson, Montreal Canadiens
Bob Nystrom, New York Islanders
Billy Harris, New York Islanders
Steve Vickers, New York Rangers
Bill Barber, Philadelphia Flyers
Jimmy Watson, Philadelphia Flyers
Tom Bladon, Philadelphia Flyers
Denis Herron, Pittsburgh Penguins
Connie Madigan, St. Louis Blues
Don Lever, Vancouver Canucks

Last games
The following is a list of players of note that played their last game in the NHL in 1972–73 (listed with their last team):
Jacques Plante, Boston Bruins
Pat Stapleton, Chicago Black Hawks
Ralph Backstrom, Chicago Black Hawks
Harry Howell, Los Angeles Kings
Ron Stewart, New York Islanders
Ken Schinkel, Pittsburgh Penguins
Connie Madigan, St. Louis BLues
Bob Baun, Toronto Maple Leafs
Dave Balon, Vancouver Canucks

NOTE: Plante, Stapleton, Backstrom, Howell and Balon would finish their major professional careers in the World Hockey Association.

See also 
 List of Stanley Cup champions
 1972 NHL Amateur Draft
 1972 NHL Expansion Draft
 1972–73 NHL transactions
 26th National Hockey League All-Star Game
 National Hockey League All-Star Game
 1972 Summit Series
 World Hockey Association
 List of WHA seasons
 1972 in sports
 1973 in sports

References
 
 
 
 

Notes

External links
Hockey Database
NHL.com

 
1972–73 in Canadian ice hockey by league
1972–73 in American ice hockey by league